The Butler Bulldogs women's soccer team is an intercollegiate varsity sports team of Butler University, an NCAA Division I member school located in Indianapolis, IN. The team played its final season in the Horizon League in 2011; on July 1, 2012, the Bulldogs joined the Atlantic 10 Conference for one season. They currently play in the Big East Conference.

Current roster

History
Butler University first fielded a varsity women's soccer team in 1991, when they earned a 10–7–1 record under head coach Bryan Blitz, including a 0–3–0 record in the Midwestern Collegiate Conference (now called the Horizon League).  Coach Blitz left the program following the 1995 season, the same season as the Bulldogs' first conference championship.  The Bulldogs were next coached by George Van Linder, who led the team to its second conference championship and two conference runner-up finishes before departing after the 1998 season.  Woody Sherwood served as the Bulldogs' third women's soccer coach and led the team to its third conference championship in 1999; under his leadership the team only once finished lower than third in the Horizon League.

The Bulldogs' current head coach, Tari St. John began serving as head coach in the 2006 season.  Aside from the head coach, Butler employs one assistant coach on a part-time basis. This position is currently held by Ric Huffman, who has held the position since 2009.   Huffman also serves as the head coach of the Dynamo Football Club, also located in Indianapolis, and is a former member of the Indiana University men's soccer team and the Indiana Twisters of the Continental Indoor Soccer League. He also played on the 1998 National Indoor Championship team.   The position was previously held by Greg Miller, who is the current head coach for the Pittsburgh Panthers.  All other women's soccer coaches serve on a volunteer basis.

Butler left the Horizon League following the 2011 season when the athletic department moved to the Atlantic 10 Conference.  During their time in the Horizon, the Bulldogs earned one conference tournament championship, in 1996, but the team did not qualify for the NCAA tournament because the conference did not have an automatic bid at that time.  However, the team was the tournament runner-up six times, in 1994, 1997, 1998, 2001, 2002, and 2010.  The team also won four conference season championships, in 1995, 1996, 1999, and 2010.

Joining the Atlantic 10 Conference presented some challenges, including schedule adjustments, because the move came a year ahead of schedule.   For example, the Bulldogs were scheduled to play an exhibition game against the defending Atlantic 10 champions, the Dayton Flyers, but the game had to be rescheduled as a conference game later in the season. Other teams had to redo their schedules in a matter of weeks after their previously finalized schedules were already released.

Yearly records

Players, awards, and recognition

Outreach
In response to the growth of interested youths in the Indianapolis area, where the Butler Bulldogs are located, the soccer program offers several soccer camps for various age groups. The camp is instructed by several members of the women's soccer program, including head coach Tari St. John.

In addition to the camps, the Butler Bulldogs women's soccer program annually wears pink jerseys in support the "fight against breast cancer."  The jerseys are sold to the public following the game to raise proceeds for the cause.

References

External links

 
1991 establishments in Indiana
NCAA Division I women's soccer teams